The Luhn algorithm or Luhn formula, also known as the "modulus 10" or "mod 10" algorithm, named after its creator, IBM scientist Hans Peter Luhn, is a simple checksum formula used to validate a variety of identification numbers, such as credit card numbers, IMEI numbers, National Provider Identifier numbers in the United States, Canadian social insurance numbers, Israeli ID numbers, South African ID numbers, Swedish national identification numbers, Swedish Corporate Identity Numbers (OrgNr), Greek Social Security Numbers (ΑΜΚΑ), SIM card numbers, European patent application number and survey codes appearing on McDonald's, Taco Bell, and Tractor Supply Co. receipts. It is described in U.S. Patent No. 2,950,048, granted on August 23, 1960.

The algorithm is in the public domain and is in wide use today. It is specified in ISO/IEC 7812-1. It is not intended to be a cryptographically secure hash function; it was designed to protect against accidental errors, not malicious attacks. Most credit cards and many government identification numbers use the algorithm as a simple method of distinguishing valid numbers from mistyped or otherwise incorrect numbers.

Description
The check digit is computed as follows:
 If the number already contains the check digit, drop that digit to form the "payload." The check digit is most often the last digit.
 With the payload, start from the rightmost digit. Moving left, double the value of every second digit (including the rightmost digit). 
 Sum the values of the resulting digits.

Example for computing check digit 

Assume an example of an account number 7992739871 (just the "payload", check digit not yet included):

The sum of the resulting digits is 67.

This makes the full account number read 79927398713.

Example for validating check digit 

 Drop the check digit (last digit) of the number to validate. (e.g. 79927398713 -> 7992739871)
 Calculate the check digit (see above)
 Compare your result with the original check digit. If both numbers match, the result is valid. (e.g.).

Strengths and weaknesses
The Luhn algorithm will detect most single-digit error (except for 0↔5 with a multiplier of 2), as well as almost all transpositions of adjacent digits.  It will not, however, detect transposition of the two-digit sequence 09 to 90 (or vice versa). It will detect most of the possible twin errors (it will not detect 22 ↔ 55, 33 ↔ 66 or 44 ↔ 77).

Other, more complex check-digit algorithms (such as the Verhoeff algorithm and the Damm algorithm) can detect more transcription errors. The Luhn mod N algorithm is an extension that supports non-numerical strings.

Because the algorithm operates on the digits in a right-to-left manner and zero digits affect the result only if they cause shift in position, zero-padding the beginning of a string of numbers does not affect the calculation.  Therefore, systems that pad to a specific number of digits (by converting 1234 to 0001234 for instance) can perform Luhn validation before or after the padding and achieve the same result.

The algorithm appeared in a United States Patent for a simple, hand-held, mechanical device for computing the checksum. The device took the mod 10 sum by mechanical means. The substitution digits, that is, the results of the double and reduce procedure, were not produced mechanically. Rather, the digits were marked in their permuted order on the body of the machine.

Pseudocode implementation 

The following function takes a card number, including the check digit, as an array of integers and outputs true if the check digit is correct, false otherwise.

 function isValid(cardNumber[1..length])
     sum := 0
     parity := length mod 2
     for i from 1 to length do
         if i mod 2 != parity then
             sum := sum + cardNumber[i]
         elseif cardNumber[i] > 4 then
             sum := sum + 2 * cardNumber[i] - 9
         else
             sum := sum + 2 * cardNumber[i]
         end if
     end for
     return sum mod 10 = 0
 end function

References

External links
 Implementation in 150 languages on the Rosetta Code project

Modular arithmetic
Checksum algorithms
Error detection and correction
1954 introductions
Articles with example pseudocode
Management cybernetics